Jesse Rantamäki (born 12 August 1996) is a Finnish former ice hockey player. He played with Vaasan Sport in the Finnish Liiga.

Rantamäki made his Liiga debut playing with Vaasan Sport during the 2014–15 season.

References

External links

1996 births
Living people
Finnish ice hockey forwards
Vaasan Sport players
People from Seinäjoki
Sportspeople from South Ostrobothnia